The Aurealis Awards are presented annually by the Australia-based Chimaera Publications and WASFF to published works in order to "recognise the achievements of Australian science fiction, fantasy, horror writers". To qualify, a work must have been first published by an Australian citizen or permanent resident between 1 January and 31 December of the corresponding year; the presentation ceremony is held the following year. It has grown from a small function of around 20 people to a two-day event attended by over 200 people.

Since their creation in 1995, awards have been given in various categories of speculative fiction. Categories currently include science fiction, fantasy, horror, speculative young adult fiction—with separate awards for novels and short fiction—collections, anthologies, illustrative works or graphic novels, children's books, and an award for excellence in speculative fiction. The awards have attracted the attention of publishers by setting down a benchmark in science fiction and fantasy. The continued sponsorship by publishers such as HarperCollins and Orbit has identified the award as an honour to be taken seriously.

The results are decided by a panel of judges from a list of submitted nominees; the long-list of nominees is reduced to a short-list of finalists. The judges are selected from a public application process by the Award's management team.

This article lists all the short-list nominees and winners in the best science fiction novel category, as well as novels that have received honourable mentions. Since 2003, honourable mentions have been awarded intermittently. Damien Broderick and Jay Kristoff have won the award three times, while five have won it twice – K. A. Bedford, Greg Egan, Amie Kaufman, Sean McMullen, and Sean Williams. Williams holds the record for most nominations with 14. Rory Barnes, James Bradley, Simon Brown, Sara Creasy, Nina D'Aleo, Joel Shepherd, Meagan Spooner, Graham Storrs, and Tess Williams share the record for most nominations without winning, each having been nominated twice.

Winners and nominees
In the following table, the years correspond to the year of the book's eligibility; the ceremonies are always held the following year. Each year links to the corresponding "year in literature" article. Entries with a blue background have won the award; those with a white background are the nominees on the short-list.

 Winners and joint winners
 Nominees on the shortlist

Honourable mentions
In the following table, the years correspond to the year of the book's eligibility; the ceremonies are always held the following year. Each year links to the corresponding "year in literature" article.

See also
Ditmar Award, an Australian science fiction award established in 1969

References

External links
Aurealis Awards official site

Aurealis Awards
Lists of speculative fiction-related award winners and nominees
Australian science fiction awards